Gigi & Nate is a 2022 American coming-of-age drama film directed by Nick Hamm from a screenplay by David Hudgins. The film is based on a true story of a quadriplegic and a capuchin monkey. The film was released in the United States on September 2, 2022, by Roadside Attractions.

Plot
Nate Gibson gets bacterial meningitis after diving into a lake at his family's Fourth of July weekend party in the fictional town of Happy Days, North Carolina, and is in such bad condition that he becomes quadripalegic and is told his condition is likely mortal. Nate's mother, Claire, insists that he be transferred from the local hospital to one in Nashville, Tennessee. After four years of living in Nashville, Nate survives but falls into a deep depression and tries to commit suicide. Claire contacts Cebus, an organization that trains animals to be service animals, who give him a capuchin named Gigi to help Nate cope with his illness. To the surprise of Nate's caretakers, Gigi helps Nate with his rehabilitation exercises, giving him hope for another chance at life.

As video footage of Gigi and Nate together at a local grocery store and a drinking party becomes public, an animal rights group named Americans For Animal Protection (AFAP) hold a protest outside the Gibsons' home and threaten to make it illegal for capuchins to become service animals. Despite being doubtful of the idea, Annabelle decides to side with him as she grew to notice the bond he had with Gigi. However, the ruling goes in favor of AFAP 2-1, forcing Nate to give up Gigi. As Nate's mother throws out Gigi's cage, his grandmother notices that North Carolina allows capuchins as service animals, and the family moves back there. During a Fourth of July barbecue at the new estate, Nate reveals that he got a full-ride acceptance to a college that will allow him to use Gigi as his service animal.

Cast
Charlie Rowe as Nate Gibson
Marcia Gay Harden as Claire, Nate's mother
Josephine Langford as Katy, Nate's older sister
Hannah Alligood as Annabelle, Nate's younger sister
Jim Belushi as Dan, Nate's father
Diane Ladd as Nate's grandmother
Zoe Colletti as Lori

Production
Principal photography for Gigi & Nate began on March 29, 2021, in Los Angeles. In May 2021, it was reported that filming also took place in North Carolina and that Marcia Gay Harden, Charlie Rowe, Josephine Langford, Zoe Colletti, Hannah Alligood, Jim Belushi, and Diane Ladd would star. Filming concluded on May 29, 2021. The film was released on September 2, 2022.

Reception

Box office
The film was released alongside Honk for Jesus. Save Your Soul. and made $990,279 from 1,184 theaters in its opening weekend, and a total of $1.3 million over the four-day Labor Day frame. 65% of the audience was female, 67% was over the age of 35, and 64% was white and it became box office bomb.

Critical response
On Rotten Tomatoes, the film holds an approval rating of 16% based on 31 reviews, with an average rating of 5.1/10. The website's critics consensus reads: "There's no denying Gigi & Nates good intentions -- but it's also impossible to ignore this cloying drama's clunky execution." Metacritic assigned the film a weighted average score of 45 out of 100, based on seven critics, indicating "mixed or average reviews". Audiences polled by PostTrak gave the film an 81% overall positive score, with 60% saying they would definitely recommend it.

References

External links

2022 drama films
2020s American films
2020s coming-of-age drama films
2020s English-language films
American coming-of-age drama films
American films based on actual events
Coming-of-age films based on actual events
Drama films based on actual events
Films about monkeys
Films about paraplegics or quadriplegics
Films directed by Nick Hamm
Films scored by Paul Leonard-Morgan
Films set in Nashville, Tennessee
Films set in North Carolina
Films shot in Los Angeles
Films shot in North Carolina
Independence Day (United States) films
Roadside Attractions films